Bhim Singh (? – 22 July 1537) was a sixteenth-century Rajput ruler of Amber.

He was the eldest son of his father, Raja Prithviraj Singh I, by his wife Bala Bai, a daughter of Rao Lunkaran of Bikaner. Some sources allege that Prithviraj died at the hands of Bhim, who in turn was later killed by his own son Askaran. However, these claims of patricide are dismissed by historian Jadunath Sarkar, who asserts that they lack credibility since their sources are anonymous and undated. Bhim is also said to have overthrown his predecessor, his brother Puranmal, though this too is uncertain.

Bhim only reigned three and a half years before dying on 22 July 1537. He was succeeded in quick succession by two sons, Ratan Singh and Askaran, before the throne eventually passed to his younger brother Bharmal.

Ancestry

References

Maharajas of Jaipur
1537 deaths
People from Jaipur district